Febris, or Dea Febris, is the Roman goddess of fevers, who embodied, but also protected people from fever and malaria. Because of this, Febris was a feared goddess whom people wanted the favour of. She does not have a myth of her own nor mentioned in a myth. Among her characteristic attributes are "shrewdness" and "honesty", according to Seneca the Younger's Apocolocyntosis. 

Febris was accompanied by two daughters or sisters of her named Dea Tertiana and Dea Quartana, the goddesses of tertian and quartan fever of malaria because the fever would come back in every three or four days. Theodorus Priscianus mentions Saturn as Tertiana and Quartana's father.
 
The goddess Febris belongs to the apotropaic (turning away) deities (Lat. Dii averrunci) who have power over a specific evil: to impose it or to get rid of it. Romans worshipped Febris so she would not do harm to them. She may have originated from the Etruscan-Roman god of purification, Februus. Unlike some Roman deities, Febris was not derived from a Greek deity.

Name
Febris is the Latin word for fever which the English word "fever" has originated from. The word febris is from Proto-Italic *feɣʷris, from Proto-Indo-European *dʰegʷʰris (which is an extension of the root *dʰegʷʰ- meaning “to burn, warm”). Her name is often translated to English as Fever.

Some of Juno's epithets are spelt similarly to Febris' name, such as Februalis, Februata, Februa which are also of the same etymological root as febris.

Cult
Febris had at least three temples in ancient Rome, of which one was located between the Palatine and Velabrum. The second temple was on the Esquiline and the last on the Vicus Longus. Febris' temples were visited by people with fevers. In those temples, people wore protective amulets against diseases, especially malaria at the time. She was invoked with the formula Febris diva, Febris sancta, Febris magna (Divine Fever, Holy Fever, Great Fever). An inscription, which was later revealed to be a possible forgery, saying Febri Divae, Febri Sanctae, Febri Magnae, Camilla Amata pro filio male affecto was discovered in Transylvania. 

An inscription dedicated to Quartana in Nemausus, Gaul, dated to the third century (CIL 12.3129) and another inscription dedicated to Tertiana in Habitancum (Risingham), Northern England (CIL 7.999) were discovered.

The Ancient Greeks under Roman rule may have worshipped a similar fever god named Pyretos (Πυρετός), the analogous translation of the Roman goddess Febris. Febris might have been worshipped in the Medieval-era Christian Rome disguised under the name Madonna delle Febbri (or della Febbre) as one of her temples is known to be converted into a church. The cult of Febris could be as old as the Roman civilisation.

In literature

Apocolocyntosis
Febris appears with Hercules in the sixth part of Apocolocyntosis. She reveals that Claudius was a "German Gaul" and a liar along with many other things about him when Claudius lied to Jupiter about himself. This made Emperor Claudius angry, Claudius expressed his wrath by shouting unintelligible words that nobody understood, except for the order by a hand gesture for Febris to be beheaded. However, his wish was dismissed.

Poliziano's In Albieram Albitiam puellam formosissimam morientem (1473) 
Febris was included as a character in the Italian poet Angelo Poliziano's Latin work In Albieram Albitiam puellam formosissimam morientem. Poliziano's Febris is his own fictional depiction rather than an actual mythological depiction. 

Febris appears to a dying young woman named Albiera degli Albizzi. Despite never being physically described previously, Poliziano depicted Febris holding a torch in one hand and a snowball in the other, in a chariot drawn by monster-like lions which was accompanied by a train of monsters. She was described as looking "gruesome", similar to Erinyes, as opposed to the beauty of Albiera degli Albizzi. She gives a deadly poison to sick Albizzi after saying "those who live sweet, die sweet" and then flies away with the lions.

See also
Februus
Jvarasura; god of fever and disease in Hindu mythology 
List of health deities

Notes

References

External links
 Myth Index - Febris - 
 William Smith Smith, Dictionary of Greek and Roman Biography and Mythology, v. 2, page 142

Health goddesses
Roman goddesses
Malaria
Ancient Roman medicine
Roman deities